Harry Nicolson (born 16 January 2001) is a Scottish professional footballer who currently plays as a defender for Clachnacuddin in the Highland League.

Club career 
Nicolson joined the Inverness Caledonian Thistle youth ranks at age 7, before being promoted to the Senior Team in 2019. However, his entire time at Inverness was spent out on loan to Fort William and Clachnacuddin in the Highland League, and Elgin City in League Two, before eventually being released by the club at the end of the 2021–22 campaign.

On 6 July 2022, Harry Nicolson joined Irish Premier Division side, Finn Harps. Nicolson made his debut 11 days later in a 2–1 home loss to Derry City.

In January 2023, Nicolson returned to Clachnacuddin after leaving Finn Harps.

Career statistics 
As of 6 August 2022

References 

Inverness Caledonian Thistle F.C. players
Fort William F.C. players
Elgin City F.C. players
Clachnacuddin F.C. players
Finn Harps F.C. players
2001 births
Scottish footballers
Living people
League of Ireland players
Expatriate association footballers in the Republic of Ireland